Terence Vella (born 20 April 1990) is a Maltese professional footballer who plays for Maltese Challenge League side Marsaxlokk, where he plays as a forward.

Playing career

Marsaxlokk
Vella signed for Maltese Challenge League side Marsaxlokk on 19 June 2021.

Honours

Club
Floriana
 Maltese Premier League (1): 2019–20

References

External links

1990 births
Living people
Maltese footballers
Malta international footballers
Maltese Premier League players
Gudja United F.C. players
Pietà Hotspurs F.C. players
Mosta F.C. players
Birkirkara F.C. players
Ħamrun Spartans F.C. players
Naxxar Lions F.C. players
Qormi F.C. players
Senglea Athletic F.C. players
Floriana F.C. players
Marsaxlokk F.C. players
Association football forwards